The British American Land Company (BALC) was a company formed in 1832 for the purpose of purchasing land and encouraging British immigration to Lower Canada. It was founded and promoted by John Galt, Edward Ellice and others to acquire and manage the development of almost  of Crown land and other lands in the Eastern Townships of Lower Canada, in order to encourage the immigration of British subjects to the region. In comparison to the Canada Company, a similar enterprise in Upper Canada that thrived through collaboration with the local government, the BALC indulged in land speculation, made immigration a secondary priority, and struggled throughout its existence.

Origin and formation

Following the success of the Canada Company in spurring settlement efforts in Upper Canada, similar efforts were initiated to establish a similar company to promote settlement in the Eastern Townships of Lower Canada. A group of investors in Montreal, headed by Francis Nathaniel Burton, proposed organizing a Lower Canada Land Company, and sent William Bowman Felton to London to promote their venture. While there, he encountered a group with similar objectives. The groups decided to combine together, and, at a meeting in February 1832, decided to proceed with creating the British American Land Company.

It was incorporated by royal charter in March 1834, and secured a private Act from the Parliament of the United Kingdom, enabling it to:

operate directly in any of the Provinces and colonies in British North America by virtue of the Royal charter, and appoint Commissioners and Agents for the purpose of purchasing and disposing of land therein;
where any seigniorial lands are acquired by the Company (whether held à titre de fief et seigneurie, à titre de fief en arrière-fief, or à titre de cens), commute all feudal and seigniorial rights, so that such lands will be held in free and common socage (and any Crown lands acquired by the Company would have the same status); and
hire indentured servants, for periods of time not to exceed seven years, for service in British North America.

The following Commissioners would be appointed:

Peter McGill and George Moffatt (acting jointly) (1834-1835)
Arthur C. Webster (1835-1837)
John Fraser (1837-1844)
Alexander Tilloch Galt (1844-1855)
Richard William Heneker (1856-1902)
James Davidson (1903-)
George Cate

Land holdings and later interests

Initial activities

Upon Fraser's appointment in 1835, the Company's activities began in earnest, being concentrated in three places:

Sherbrooke, as the Company's headquarters
Victoria, in Lingwick Township, as the centre of settlement activities
Port St. Francis, at the foot of Lake Saint Pierre, as the port of entry for the district

Colonisation efforts
Wharves and warehouses were constructed at Port St. Francis, as were grist mills, sawmills and other facilities within the territory. Lands were sold subject to a 20% down payment, with the balance payable in three subsequent annual instalments, and the Company also offered to help clear the land and build a log house upon it for an extra charge. During 1836, during the first year of activity, three hundred families had settled in Victoria, occupying , while  had been sold in other districts.

By deliberately working to increase the English-speaking portion of the population of Lower Canada, it was denounced by the Parti patriote and was referred to in the Ninety-two Resolutions adopted by the Legislative Assembly of Lower Canada in 1834. It was also denounced during the Lower Canada Rebellion in 1837, where a proclamation issued by Patriote leader Robert Nelson declared that all unsold Company lands "are of right the property of the State of Lower Canada."

The expenses incurred to open up the lands were high in relation to the revenues earned from their subsequent disposition. The 1837 Rebellion discouraged immigration to Lower Canada, frightening off the better class of potential immigrants, and many of the current settlers were defaulting on their payments or even abandoning their lands. Many of the local agents were also neglecting their duties or pilfering the company stores, and the Company resisted attempts by local councils to impose property taxes on its holdings. This would eventually lead to the Company experiencing financial problems in 1841, forcing it to return  of the St. Francis tract to the Province of Canada.

In 1843, the Company began focus its efforts on selling land to the local French-Canadian population, disposing it on new terms, consisting of no down payment, interest payments only for the first ten years, with the principal then being payable in four equal annual instalments. In the beginning, such obligations could be settled by payment in kind.

In 1858, the Company returned a further  to the Province, in consideration for certain sums due to the Crown.

Exploitation of natural resources and manufacturing
The Company's finances would subsequently improve, and its earnings would be invested in other industrial concerns, including railroads, mining and Sherbrooke's textile mills, and it would operate other industrial enterprises itself. It would also get into the business of lending money, and, in 1876, the law governing interest was modified with respect to the loans made by the Company, so that it could charge an annual rate up to 8%, in place of the then legal maximum of 6%.

It would also begin to sell landholdings in large blocks for their value as timber. In 1872, it sold  to Cyrus Sullivan Clark of Bangor, Maine, who purchased a further  from the company in the following year. These holdings were approximately half the size of the Crown timber limits that he already possessed.

Later years
By 1910, it had sold the greater part of its holdings, but continued to operate until its dissolution in 1948. Most of the Company's records appear to have since been carelessly destroyed.

Notable shareholders
Shareholders in the company included:
Boyd Alexander
James Whatman Bosanquet
George Fife Angas
Russell Ellice
Pascoe St Leger Grenfell
Claudius Stephen Hunter
Patrick Maxwell Stewart

Coat of arms

Notes and references

Notes

References

Bibliography

History
 
 
 
 
Academic works
 
 
 
 
 
Biography

External links
 
 

Chartered companies
English colonization of the Americas
Economic history of Canada
Political history of Quebec
Lower Canada
1834 establishments in Lower Canada
1948 disestablishments in Canada
Canadian companies established in 1834
Companies disestablished in 1948
Trading companies of Canada
Trading companies established in the 19th century
Trading companies disestablished in the 20th century